Boysitter is a 2014 Taiwanese romantic-comedy television series created and produced by TVBS. Starring Annie Chen, River Huang, Melvin Sia as the main leads with Nita Lei, Yang Qing and Gao Shan Feng as the main supporting cast. The original title literally translates to "Pretty Woman Grabs First Marriage". Filming began in August 2014 and wrapped up on November 16, 2014. First original broadcast began on December 6, 2014, on both TVBS and CTV airing every Saturday night at 9:00-10:00 pm.

Synopsis
Six years ago Yuan Fei (Annie Chen) runs out on her immature longtime boyfriend Hao Jian Ren (River Huang), when he doesn't show up on their wedding day. Six years later the two meet again. Yuan Fei is now a career driven single mother and also Jian Ren's senior at work. The two get entangled in a love triangle when playboy Wen Hao Ran (Melvin Sia) comes into the picture. Soon Yuan Fei must choose between her still immature ex-boyfriend Jian Ren or Hao Ran who might just be ready to settle down.

Plot summary
During a plane ride home, Hao Jian Ren who is sitting in coach spots a tall statuesque woman in first class who resembles his ex-girlfriend. He lies to the flight attendant that he thinks the woman in first class is his long lost sister and agrees to take the flight attendant out to dinner if she lets him go into first class to take a better look at the women. But as he is about to lift up the shades covering the mysterious woman's face the plane is preparing to land and he is asked to go back to his seat. The mysterious woman in first class is indeed his ex-girlfriend Yuan Fei, who ran out on him six years ago when he didn't show up to their wedding.

Six years ago Fei pressures Jian Ren into marrying her by withholding sex if he doesn't agree. Jian Ren who is immature and thinking about himself only agreed to Fei's proposal with sex on the line. However, on their wedding day Jian Ren does not show up. Embarrass and fed up with Jian ren's immature behavior, Fei runs out on him without a word. However these six years Fei is still keeping tabs on Jian Ren through mutual friends who tells her about Jian Ren's dating life. The two meet again when she becomes his senior at work, but she is now a career driven women with a child.

Cast

Main cast
Annie Chen as Yuan Fei 
River Huang as Hao Jian Ren 
Melvin Sia as Wen Hao Ran 
Nita Lei as Ding Xiao En 
Yang Qing as Fang Mei Lin 
Gao Shan Feng as Zhang Wen Hua

Supporting cast
Hsu Hsiao-shun as Qian Shu De 
Kenny Kuo as An Di
Lia Lee as Barbie
Jun Dong as Zhang Wen Qing 
Bebe Du as Zhang Wei Ting
Eason Yu as Yuan Shi Zu 
Hsieh Li-Chin as Kuo Rui Huang

Guest role
Hu Yingzhen as plane passenger 
Jenna Wang as flight attendant
Jacko Chiang as Pub owner 
Grace Wu as Pub girl

Soundtrack

Boysitter Original TV Soundtrack (OST) (摩女搶頭婚 電視原聲帶) was released on December 5, 2014, by various artists under Rock Records (TW) record label. It contains 14 tracks total. The opening theme is track 1 "Bear Homie" (熊麻吉) by 831 八三夭, while the closing theme is track 2 "A Little Less Talent" (少一點天份) by Shi Shi 孫盛希.

Track listing

Broadcast

Episode ratings
<small>Competing dramas on rival channels airing at the same time slot were:
GTV - Apple in Your Eye, Mr. Right Wanted
SETTV - Say Again Yes I Do

CTV

References

External links
Boysitter TVBS Website  
Boysitter CTV Website   

2014 Taiwanese television series debuts
2015 Taiwanese television series endings
Taiwanese romance television series
China Television original programming
TVBS original programming